Skeiane Station is a railway station in the city of Sandnes which is in the western part of Sandnes Municipality in Rogaland county, Norway. The station is located in the southern part of the city centre, a short distance south of the Sandnes Sentrum Station. The station has a shelter for waiting, but no food, restroom, or ticketing services.

This station is served by the local Jæren Commuter Rail service running between Stavanger and Egersund on the Sørlandet Line.  The station was the central station for Sandnes between 1955 and 1996 (called Sandnes Station), but was then replaced by a rebuilt Sandnes Sentrum Station. This station was then renamed Sandnes holdeplass (from 1996 until 2017), serving only as a stop for local trains, but officially it remained the main station. To reduce confusion with the now much more used station with similar name, the station was renamed to "Skeiane" from 12 August 2017.

References

Railway stations on the Sørlandet Line
Railway stations in Sandnes
Railway stations opened in 1955
1955 establishments in Norway